The Battle of Kinburn was fought on 12 October (N.S.)/1 October (O.S.) 1787 as part of the Russo-Turkish War (1787–1792).

A weak fortress, Kinburn was located opposite Ochakov on a sand bank forming a part of the Dnieper river delta. It covered approaches to the fleet base at Kherson. The reason for the Ottoman attack on Kinburn was to deprive the enemy of a base for the siege of Ochakov and Kherson fleet base.

The forces
Alexander Suvorov, commanding the Russian garrison, had 19 bronze and 300 iron artillery pieces in the fortress, weak in power and range, 1,500 infantry in Kinburne and 2,500 infantry, 28 regimental and 10 field guns, and Cossack cavalry within 30 versts (roughly 50 kilometers) from the fortress.

The Ottomans had three 60 gun ships of the line, four 34 gun frigates, four bomb vessels (floating batteries), and 14 gunboats with 4 guns each. Altogether, about 400 guns. The Ottoman troops were carried by 23 transport vessels.

First attack
During September, the Ottoman fleet twice carried out ranging fire of the fleet against the coast, trying to locate position of the Russian gun emplacements. During one bombardment, a Russian galley "Desna" which was part of a force of two frigates and four galleys (themselves a part of Admiral Mordvinov's flotilla), intervened on the initiative of its Maltese captain, and drove off the Ottoman gunboats. On the 10 and 11 October bombardment of Kinburn was conducted from the Ottoman ships again. On 12 October 1787 at 9 in the morning an amphibious landing of 6,000 troops was conducted on two separate sites (5,300 on the bank's 'tongue' itself, and the rest 10–15 versts away at a village of Bienka), with the fleet supporting the landing with fire. The pasha of Ochakov ordered the ships to leave after the landing so that the amphibious landing force would not contemplate withdrawal. The landing force begun to dig a total of 15 trenches, in the attempt to move closer to Kinburn.

Suvorov called for reinforcement (2,500 infantry and Cossacks) and waited, while being occupied with public prayer in the church (Celebration of the Covering), receiving dispatches and messages in the church.

Counterattack
At midday the Turks approached to within 200 paces of the fortress. Suvorov began the first counterattack with 1,500 soldiers of the Orlov infantry and Schlisselburg grenadier regiments. Those attacking troops took 10 of the 15 trenches, but under flank fire of the Ottoman fleet they were forced to retreat to the fortress. Suvorov himself was wounded in the side and left hand, and was saved only through the courage of Stepan Novikov, a grenadier of the Schlisselburg grenadier regiment.

At 16.00 hours Russian reinforcements approached and Suvorov repeated his attack, after releasing Cossacks to attack around the left flank of the enemy over the shoals and into their rear. This attack was successful, and Turks were forced out from the trenches and forced against the coast, forcing the fleet to cease fire in order not to hit its own troops. Suvorov had two horses shot under him. The regimental guns were able to fire canister at point-blank range, causing fearful carnage among the Turks.

At night 600 Turk survivors of the landing returned on board the ships by rowboats. Several hundred hid in the reeds, and were attacked by Cossacks on the following morning. Russian losses were 2 officers and 136 others killed and 17 officers and 300 others wounded, and those of the Turk – about 4000, including two French officers dressed as Turks which were sent to Siberia.

In Suvorov's report the Schlisselburg regiment is particularly noted for bravery.
For the Kinburn victory Catherine the Great awarded Suvorov with the Order of St. Andrew and the highest praise, where she wrote: “You deserved it by faith and by faithfulness".

See also
 Battle of Kinburn (1855)

References

Bibliography
 Широкорад А.Б. Русско-Турецкие войны (под общ. ред Тараса А.Е.) Minsk: Harvest, 2000.
 

Kinburn
Kinburn
Kinburn 1787
1787 in Europe
1787 in the Ottoman Empire
1780s in Ukraine
Kinburn 1787
Alexander Suvorov
Kinburn 1787